The chief justice of Hong Kong was, until 1997, the chief judge (later 首席大法官) of the Court of Appeal of the Supreme Court of Hong Kong and the most senior judge in the court system.

Supreme Court of Hong Kong

The Supreme Court of Hong Kong existed from 1844 (before the establishment of the court (1841-1844), legal proceedings would likely have been undertaken by the British military courts and commanding officers) when British civilian control of Hong Kong commenced until 1997 when Hong Kong was returned to China. Only the last chief justice, Sir Ti-liang Yang, was Chinese by ethnicity (British subject, later a British Dependent Territory citizen); the remainder were all British or Irish, two of whom, Sir James Russell and Sir Joseph H. Kemp, both Irishmen, spoke Chinese.

Renaming of Supreme Court and title in 1997

In 1997 the Supreme Court of Hong Kong was renamed the High Court of Hong Kong.  The position was accordingly changed to Chief Judge of the High Court, while the role of head of the Hong Kong Judiciary was assumed by the chief justice of the Court of Final Appeal. The Court of Final Appeal was established to replace the role of the Judicial Committee of the Privy Council as Hong Kong's final appellate court.

List of pre-1997 chief justices

The following table lists former chief justices of the Supreme Court of Hong Kong prior to 1997. See the High Court of Hong Kong for a list of chief judges of the High Court.

See also
 Chief Justice of the Court of Final Appeal
 High Court of Hong Kong
 Supreme Court of Hong Kong
 Attorney General of Hong Kong

References

Supreme Court (Hong Kong)